Jan Przerębski (born around 1519; died on 12 January 1562 in Łowicz) - from 1551 Crown Deputy Chancellors, Grand Secretary of the Crown from 1550, royal secretary, nominate as a Bishop of Chełmn (which he never took over), from 1559 the archbishop of Gniezno and the primate of Poland, provost of the collegiate chapter in Wieluń in 1557.

References

External links
 Virtual tour Gniezno Cathedral  
List of Primates of Poland 

1510s births
1562 deaths
Archbishops of Gniezno
Place of birth missing
Date of birth uncertain
Crown Vice-Chancellors